Sepia limata is a species of cuttlefish native to the southwestern Pacific Ocean, specifically southern Queensland to New South Wales, Australia ( to ).

Females are slightly larger than males.

The type specimen was collected off Manly Beach, New South Wales. It is deposited at the Australian Museum in Sydney.

References

External links

Cuttlefish
Molluscs described in 1926
Taxa named by Tom Iredale